Julissa Mantilla Falcón is a Peruvian Rapporteur on the Rights of Older Persons for OAS. She was elected by the Organization of American States (OAS) to serve from 2020 to 2023 as a Commissioner of the Inter-American Commission on Human Rights (IACHR). In 2021 she was the first vice-President of the IACHR as part of the first all woman team of President and vice-Presidents.

Life
Her first degree was at Pontifical Catholic University of Peru and she also took a doctorate at the London School of Economics. She returned to Peru where she worked in the Peruvian Ombudperson's office for human rights where she looked at forced sterilisation. Falcon completed a study looking at sexual violence against women during armed conflict. She later worked for the Peruvian Commission for Truth and Reconciliation where she took the lead on gender related issues. Falcon is a Professor of Law and Gender at her alma mater.

On 28 June 2019 she was one of three candidates elected by the General Assembly of the OAS to serve for a four-year term from 1 January 2020 through to New Years Eve in 2023.

In March 2021 Antonia Urrejola Noguera succeeded Joel Hernández as President of the Inter-American Commission on Human Rights leading the first all woman team of President and vice-Presidents. Falcón became the first vice-President and Flávia Piovesan was the second. Falcon is the  Rapporteur on the Rights of Migrants and on the Rights of Older Persons and the Rapporteur for Argentina, Barbados, Belize, Costa Rica, Granada, Saint Vincent and the Granadines and Uruguay.

References

Living people
Peruvian women lawyers
Inter-American Commission on Human Rights commissioners
Year of birth missing (living people)
21st-century Peruvian lawyers